Simon Maxwell Helberg (born December 9, 1980) is a French-American actor and comedian. He is known for playing Howard Wolowitz in the CBS sitcom The Big Bang Theory (2007–2019), for which he won the Critics' Choice Television Award for Best Supporting Actor in a Comedy Series, and as Cosmé McMoon in the film Florence Foster Jenkins (2016), for which he was nominated for the Golden Globe Award for Best Supporting Actor – Motion Picture.

Helberg has appeared on the sketch comedy series MADtv, and has further performed in films such as Old School (2003), Good Night, and Good Luck (2005), Walk Hard: The Dewey Cox Story (2007), A Serious Man (2009) and Annette (2021).

Early life
Helberg was born on December 9, 1980, in Los Angeles. He is the son of actor Sandy Helberg and casting director Harriet Helberg (née Birnbaum). He was raised Jewish, "Conservative to Reform but more Reform as time went on."

Helberg attended middle and high school at the Crossroads School in Santa Monica, California, with Jason Ritter, who later became his roommate at New York University. He attended New York University's Tisch School of the Arts, where he trained at the Atlantic Theater Company.

Career
Since the early 2000s, Helberg performed with comedian Derek Waters as the sketch comedy duo Derek & Simon. In 2007, the two starred together in Derek and Simon: The Show, a web series they created with comedian Bob Odenkirk for the comedy website Super Deluxe. They previously made two short films "Derek & Simon: The Pity Card" (co-starring Zach Galifianakis and Bill Hader) and "Derek & Simon: A Bee and a Cigarette" (co-starring Casey Wilson and Emily Rutherfurd) and had a pilot deal with HBO in 2005. One of Helberg's earliest jobs in television was briefly joining the cast of MADtv for one season in 2002.

Helberg appeared in the 2002 feature film Van Wilder as one of the geeky students for whom Van Wilder was throwing a party. He had a minor role in the 2003 movie Old School. In 2004, he was in two episodes of Reno 911!: Student Driver in "Raineesha X" and Hooker Buying Son in "Not Without My Mustache". He had a small role in the sixth episode of Quintuplets, "Get a Job", as a man called Neil working behind the counter at a shoe shop where Paige and Patton were working.

In 2004, he appeared in the film A Cinderella Story, starring Hilary Duff and Chad Michael Murray. Helberg played the minor role of Simon in George Clooney's 2005 film Good Night, and Good Luck, where he had one line. In 2005, he had a bit part on Arrested Development as Jeff, an employee of the film studio where Maeby worked. From 2006 to 2007, he had a minor supporting role as Alex Dwyer in the drama Studio 60 on the Sunset Strip. In 2006, he appeared in a series of comical TV commercials for Richard Branson's UK financial services company Virgin Money. He played a small role in the 2007 film Walk Hard: The Dewey Cox Story as a Jewish record producer.

In 2007, Helberg was cast as Howard Wolowitz, in the CBS comedy series The Big Bang Theory. In 2004, Helberg portrayed Seth Tobin in Joey, a character similar to Howard.

He appeared as the character Moist in Dr. Horrible's Sing-Along Blog, and had a small role in the pilot episode of the Judd Apatow-produced sitcom Undeclared. In the 2009 Coen brothers film A Serious Man, he played junior Rabbi Scott Ginsler. He had a minor role in the season 4 finale of The Guild as one of the Game Masters.

In 2016, Helberg starred alongside Meryl Streep and Hugh Grant in Florence Foster Jenkins, directed by Stephen Frears; he played pianist Cosmé McMoon and his performance was nominated for the Golden Globe Award for Best Supporting Actor – Motion Picture. Not only did Helberg act in the film, he also played the piano.  Helberg next starred in Annette, opposite Adam Driver.

Forbes placed him third in its world's highest-paid TV actors list in 2018, his revenues rising to $23.5 million in that year.

Personal life
Helberg married actress Jocelyn Towne, the niece of screenwriter Robert Towne, on July 7, 2007. They have a daughter and a son.

Helberg has been friends with Nathan Hamill, son of actor Mark Hamill, since he was 9 years old. Helberg has been friends with Jason Ritter since he was 12 years old. They went to college together and continue to work together when given the opportunity. 

Through his wife Jocelyn (who became a French citizen in 2013 through her French mother), Helberg himself became a French citizen to obtain the role of the Conductor in French cult director Leos Carax’s English-language debut Annette, which opened the 2021 Cannes Film Festival.

Filmography

Film

Television

Theatre

Awards and nominations

References

External links

 

1980 births
Living people
20th-century American male actors
21st-century American male actors
20th-century American comedians
21st-century American comedians
Jewish American male comedians
American male comedians
American male film actors
American male television actors
American people of German-Jewish descent
American Reform Jews
American sketch comedians
Jewish American male actors
Male actors from Los Angeles
Tisch School of the Arts alumni
Crossroads School alumni
American male comedy actors